Elk Lake is a lake in Douglas County, in the U.S. state of Minnesota.

Elk Lake was named for the elk which frequented it.

See also
List of lakes in Minnesota

References

Lakes of Minnesota
Lakes of Douglas County, Minnesota